Ilya Vladimirovich Vorotnikov (born 11 February 2001) is a Russian football player who plays as a left winger for FC Sokol Saratov.

Club career
He made his debut in the Russian Professional Football League for FC Krasnodar-3 on 27 August 2018 in a game against PFC Spartak Nalchik. He made his Russian Football National League debut for FC Krasnodar-2 on 28 July 2019 in a game against FC Yenisey Krasnoyarsk.

He made his Russian Premier League debut for FC Krasnodar on 9 July 2020 in a game against FC Rubin Kazan, replacing Tonny Vilhena in the 75th minute.

References

External links
 
 
 

2001 births
Sportspeople from Voronezh Oblast
People from Novousmansky District
Living people
Russian footballers
Russia youth international footballers
Association football forwards
FC Krasnodar players
FC Krasnodar-2 players
FC SKA Rostov-on-Don players
FC Sokol Saratov players
Russian Premier League players
Russian First League players
Russian Second League players